Robert Peichung Lin (January 24, 1942 – November 17, 2012) was Chinese-born American astrophysicist. He was a professor and director of the Space Sciences Laboratory (1998–2008) at the University of California, Berkeley. He was credited with inventing the field of high energy space physics and was the principalunvestigator for the Reuven Ramaty High Energy Solar Spectroscopic Imager.

Early life and education 
Robert Lin was the son of Tung Hua Lin. He was born in Guangxi, China on January 24, 1942, and moved to London as a child and then to Michigan. He earned a Bachelor of Science degree in physics from the California Institute of Technology in 1962 and a Ph.D. from the University of California, Berkeley in 1967.

Career 
Lin's research focused on experimental space physics and high energy astrophysics. He made major contributions to topics involving solar flares, plasma phenomena in the Earth's magnetosphere, lunar and planetary geology, heliospheric physics, and high-energy astrophysics. In 2006, Lin was elected to the National Academy of Sciences for his contributions to the "behavior of electrons and ions accelerated by the sun, and detected the accompanying x-ray and gamma-ray emissions."

Personal life 
Lin suffered a sudden stroke on November 17, 2012, and died at Alta Bates Medical Center, aged 70.

References

1942 births
2012 deaths
20th-century American physicists
21st-century American physicists
American astrophysicists
American people of Chinese descent
California Institute of Technology alumni
Educators from Guangxi
Members of the United States National Academy of Sciences
Physicists from Guangxi
Tsien family
University of California, Berkeley College of Letters and Science faculty
UC Berkeley College of Letters and Science alumni